Afroartelida is a genus of beetles in the family Cerambycidae, containing the following species:

 Afroartelida quentini Vives, 2011
 Afroartelida teunisseni Vives & Adlbauer, 2005

References

Dorcasominae